Robert Graves Brown (February 20, 1921 – April 16, 2001) was an American professional basketball player in the United States' National Basketball League. He played for the Indianapolis Kautskys in three games during the 1945–46 season. He also played for the Indianapolis Pure Oils in the 1945 World Professional Basketball Tournament.

References

1921 births
2001 deaths
American men's basketball players
Basketball players from Texas
Centers (basketball)
Indianapolis Kautskys players
Oklahoma Sooners men's basketball players
People from McKinney, Texas